David Suarez (born 9 June 1979) is a French former professional footballer who played as a striker.

References
 
 
 

1979 births
Living people
People from Rodez
Sportspeople from Aveyron
Association football forwards
French footballers
Ligue 1 players
Ligue 2 players
Championnat National players
Rodez AF players
AS Cannes players
Amiens SC players
Toulouse FC players
En Avant Guingamp players
CS Sedan Ardennes players
SC Bastia players
AC Arlésien players
Vannes OC players
Footballers from Occitania (administrative region)